Honkytonk Man is a 1982 American comedy-drama musical western film set in the Great Depression. Clint Eastwood, who produced and directed, stars with his son, Kyle Eastwood. Clancy Carlile's screenplay is based on his 1980 novel of the same name. This was Marty Robbins' last appearance before he died. The story of Clint's character, Red Stovall, is loosely based on the life of Jimmie Rodgers.

Plot
Itinerant western singer Red Stovall suffers from tuberculosis but has  been given an opportunity to make it big at the Grand Ole Opry in Nashville, Tennessee. He is accompanied by his young nephew Whit. After a series of adventures which include the nephew's first sexual encounter in a brothel, they finally arrive.

While a fit of coughing in his audition ruins his chances, talent scouts for a record company are impressed enough to arrange a recording session, realizing that he has only days to live. The tuberculosis reaches a critical stage in the middle of this session, where Red's lines are filled in by Smokey, a side guitarist (country singer Marty Robbins in his last film role). Red eventually succumbs while Whit vows to tell his uncle's story. Red's vintage Lincoln Model K touring car, prevalent throughout the movie, finally 'dies' at the cemetery where Red is laid to rest.

Production
Filming took place over five weeks on location. The first part of the movie was filmed in Bird's Landing, California. However, the majority of this feature was filmed in and around Calaveras County, east of Stockton, California.  Exterior scenes include Main Street, Mountain Ranch; Main Street, Sheepranch; and the Pioneer Hotel in Sheepranch. 
The famous jail break scene was filmed in Dayton, Nevada at the corner of Pike Street (the Lincoln Highway) and W Main Street. The vintage brick building the movie-built jail was attached to is the Odeon Hall, where Marilyn Monroe's paddle ball and bar interior scenes were shot in The Misfits (1961). Extras were locally hired and many of the towns residents are seen in the movie.

Cast
 Clint Eastwood as Red Stovall
 Kyle Eastwood as Whit Wagoneer
 John McIntire as Grandpa Wagoneer
 Alexa Kenin as Marlene Mooney aka Marlene Moonglow
 Verna Bloom as Emmy Wagoneer
 Matt Clark as Virgil Wagoneer
 Barry Corbin as Derwood Arnspriger
 Jerry Hardin as Snuffy
 Tim Thomerson as Highway Patrolman
 Porter Wagoner as Dusty
 Macon McCalman as Dr. Hines
 Joe Regalbuto as Henry Axle
 Gary Grubbs as Jim Bob
 Marty Robbins as Smokey
 Tracey Walter as Pooch

Reception
Honkytonk Man received critical acclaim, and has a score of 93% on Rotten Tomatoes. The New York Post wrote, "The pace is slow, very country, but it rises to touching moments...not all perfect by any means, but ultimately a story of occasional awkward truths." Roger Ebert gave the film three stars out of four writing "This is a sweet, whimsical, low-key movie, a movie that makes you feel good without pressing you too hard."

The film opened Wednesday, December 15, 1982 in Los Angeles before expanding to 677 screens for the weekend, but only grossed $667,727, the worst opening for an Eastwood film. The film went on to gross $4.5 million at the United States and Canada box office, Eastwood's lowest grosser for more than a decade. The film was nominated for a Razzie Award for Worst Original Song for No Sweeter Cheater than You.

References

Bibliography

External links
 
 
 

1982 films
1980s musical drama films
Country music films
American Western (genre) comedy films
1980s Western (genre) comedy films
American Western (genre) films
1982 Western (genre) films
Films directed by Clint Eastwood
Films produced by Clint Eastwood
Films scored by Steve Dorff
Warner Bros. films
1982 drama films
1980s English-language films
American musical drama films
1980s American films